is a district of Setagaya, Tokyo, Japan.

Education
Setagaya Board of Education operates public elementary and junior high schools.

1-chome is zoned to Hachimanyama Elementary School (八幡山小学校). 2-4-chome and parts of 5-chome are zoned to Kamikitazawa Elementary School (上北沢小学校).  Hachimanyama and Kamikitazawa areas feed into Midorigaoka Junior High School (世田谷区立緑丘中学校). Other parts of 5-chome are zoned to Musashigaoka Elementary School (世田谷区立武蔵丘小学校) and Karasuyama Junior High School (世田谷区立烏山中学校).

References

Districts of Setagaya